Hana Sloupová (born 25 November 1991) is a former Czech football goalkeeper, who played for Sparta Praha in the Czech Women's First League.

She was a member of the Czech national team. She made her debut on 26 November 2009 in a match against Belgium.

References

External links
 
 
 

1991 births
Living people
Czech women's footballers
Czech Republic women's international footballers
Footballers from Brno
Women's association football goalkeepers
AC Sparta Praha (women) players
Czech Women's First League players